Oline is a female given name of Norwegian origin, a possible variant of Ole (name) and Olin (name). Notable people with the name include:

 Oline Pind Muus (c. 1879), Norwegian woman known as subject of a publicized US divorce case
 Gunhild Oline Hagestad (born 1942), Norwegian sociologist

See also
 Caroline Woolmer Leakey (1827–1881), known by her pen name "Oliné Keese," English writer

References

Norwegian feminine given names